Jüri Kukk (May 1, 1940 – March 27, 1981, Russia) was an Estonian professor of chemistry, a political prisoner, who died in the Soviet labor camp at Vologda after several months of being on hunger strike and psychiatric treatments.

Kukk was born in  Pärnu. He resigned from the Communist Party of the Soviet Union in 1978 and was subsequently fired from the post of associate professor of chemistry at Tartu University. He was also refused permission to emigrate.

Jüri Kukk was arrested in February 1980 "for distribution of anti-Soviet Propaganda".

References and notes

Estonian educators
Estonian chemists
Soviet dissidents
People who died on hunger strike
Resigned Communist Party of the Soviet Union members
Estonian people who died in Soviet detention
1940 births
1981 deaths
Academic staff of the University of Tartu
People from Pärnu
20th-century Estonian educators